Kennard is a surname. Notable people with the surname include:

 Beulah Elfreth Kennard, American educator and writer
 Bob Kennard, Welsh writer and agriculturist 
 Clyde Kennard, American civil rights activist
 Coleridge Kennard (disambiguation)
 Devon Kennard, American football linebacker
 Earle Hesse Kennard, physicist
 Francis J. Kennard, American architect
 Hugh Kennard, World War II RAF officer and post-war owner of a number of airlines
 John Kennard (disambiguation)
 Jonathan Kennard, English racing driver
 Joyce Kennard, Associate Justice of the Supreme Court of California
 Luke Kennard (disambiguation)
 Luke Kennard (poet) (born 1981), British poet and critic
 Luke Kennard (basketball) (born 1996), American basketball player
 Margaret Kennard, neurologist
 Matthew Kennard (disambiguation)
 Matt Kennard (actor) (born 1982), English actor
 Matt Kennard (journalist) (born 1983), English journalist
 Robert Kennard (1800–1870), English merchant, financier and entrepreneur
 Sean Kennard, Japanese‐American classical pianist
 William Kennard, the US Ambassador to the European Union

See also
 Kennard baronets
 Justice Kennard (disambiguation)
 Kennard (disambiguation)